Sheikh Abdulaziz bin Ahmad bin Ali bin Abdullah bin Jassim bin Muhammed Al Thani (c. 1946 – February 14, 2008) was the eldest son of the Emir of the State of Qatar Ahmad bin Ali Al Thani.

Biography
Sheikh Abdulaziz bin Ahmed Al Thani was born in 1946, the oldest son of Emir Ahmad bin Ali Al Thani.

Sheikh Abdulaziz served as Minister for Health between 1967 and 1972 and also as president of the Palestine Red Crescent Society. He was the crown prince of Qatar, but lost his position on 22 February 1972 when Prime Minister Khalifa bin Hamad Al Thani took power in a nonviolent palace coup.

Sheikh Abdulaziz then left Qatar and lived in exile in Saudi Arabia until his death on February 14, 2008, in Jeddah. He was buried in Al-Rayyan Cemetery in Qatar.

Sons
Abdulaziz had fifteen sons, listed here with their sons.

Khalid bin Abdulaziz bin Ahmed Al-Thani. Five sons: Ahmed, Abdullah, Hamad, Sultan, Faisal
Abdullah bin Abdulaziz bin Ahmed Al-Thani. Three sons: Abdulaziz, Ahmed, Ali
Khalifa bin Abdulaziz bin Ahmed Al-Thani. One son: Abdulaziz
Mohammed bin Abdulaziz bin Ahmed Al-Thani. Five sons: Hussein, Ahmed, Nasser, Jassim, Abdulaziz
Talal bin Abdulaziz bin Ahmed Al-Thani. Five sons: Hamad, Abdulaziz, Jassim, Abdulla, Ahmed
Hamad bin Abdulaziz bin Ahmed Al-Thani
Ali bin Abdulaziz bin Ahmed Al-Thani. Three sons: Abdulaziz, Ahmed, Jassim
Ahmed bin Abdulaziz bin Ahmed Al-Thani. Four sons: Abdulaziz, Nasser, Hamad, Khalid
AbdulRahman bin Abdulaziz bin Ahmed Al-Thani. One son: Abdulaziz
Fahad bin Abdulaziz bin Ahmed Al-Thani
Jassim bin Abdulaziz bin Ahmed Al-Thani
Al Hassan bin Abdulaziz bin Ahmed Al-Thani
Youssef bin Abdulaziz bin Ahmed Al-Thani
Bader bin Abdulaziz bin Ahmed Al-Thani 
Abdulaziz bin Abdulaziz bin Ahmed Al-Thani

References

1946 births
2008 deaths
Abdelaziz bin Ahmed
Qatari exiles
Government ministers of Qatar
Heirs apparent who never acceded
Qatari expatriates in Saudi Arabia
Sons of monarchs